Internationalen (the Swedish language name of "The Internationale") is a Swedish Trotskyist weekly newspaper of the Socialist Party.

History and profile
The newspaper was established in 1971 originally by the name Mullvaden ("the Mole") as a monthly magazine, and changed its name to Internationalen in 1974 when it became a weekly.
The earlier name is derived from a Shakespeare quotation which Marx used in The Eighteenth Brumaire of Louis Bonaparte. In act 1, scene 5 of Hamlet, Hamlet himself cries out "Well said, old mole!" 

Internationalen has approximately 2000 subscribers.

One of the paper's most famous journalists was Stieg Larsson who published articles there in the 1980s.

References

External links
http://www.internationalen.se

1971 establishments in Sweden
Newspapers established in 1971
Socialist newspapers
Communist newspapers
Communist newspapers published in Sweden
Swedish-language newspapers
Weekly newspapers published in Sweden